HeKz are a British progressive metal band founded in 2008 by Matt Young, Alastair "Al" Beveridge and Kirk Brandham.

History 
The band was formed by the original members in 2008 when they were in middle school. They released their first album, Tabula Rasa, in 2012.

In 2012, keyboardist James Messenger joined them as a fifth member, with the band then consisting of Young on bass and vocals, Alastair Beveridge and Tom Smith on guitars, Messenger on keyboards and Kirk Brandham on drums. With this line-up, they released in 2014 their second album Caerus, featuring cellist Audrey Riley.

With that same line-up, they released their third album Invicta on 20 Friday 2018.

In March 2021, they announced their fourth album, Terra Nova, a conceptual effort to be released later that year and featuring a new line-up with Young joined by guitarist Mark Bogert, keyboardist Pieter Beemsterboer and drummer Moyano el Buffalo. A part of the album will be released as an EP, and the full work will come out the following year. It will feature guest performances by keyboardist Adam Holzman.

Members

Current members 
 Matt Young – lead vocals, bass guitar (2008 – present)
 Mark Bogert – guitar (2021–present)
 Pieter Beemsterboer – keyboard (2020–present)
 Moyano el Buffalo – drums (2020–present)

Past members 
 Alastair "Al" Beveridge – guitar (2008-?)
 Tom Smith – guitar (2011-?)
 James Messenger – keyboards (2012-2018)
 Danny Young – guitar (2009-?)
 Al Beveridge – guitar (2009-?)
 Kirk Brandham – drums (2008-?)

Discography

Studio albums 
 Tabula Rasa (2011) 
 Caerus (2014)
 Invicta (2018)
 Terra Nova (2021)

References

External links 
 

British progressive metal musical groups
Musical groups established in 2008
2008 establishments in England